Jingzhou is a prefecture-level city in Hubei, China

Jingzhou may also refer to:

 Jingzhou District, in Jingzhou, Hubei, China
 Jingzhou Miao and Dong Autonomous County, in Hunan, China
 Meizhou, formerly known as Jingzhou (敬州), city in Guangdong, China
 Jingzhou (ancient China), an ancient Chinese province covering modern Hubei and Hunan
 Jingzhou (historical prefecture in Shaanxi), a historical prefecture in modern Shaanxi, China during the 10th century
 Jingzhou (historical prefecture in Gansu), a historical prefecture in modern Gansu, China between the 5th and 20th centuries

See also
 Jinzhou (disambiguation)